The 1988 Trans America Athletic Conference baseball tournament was held at Centenary Park on the campus of Centenary College of Louisiana in Shreveport, Louisiana. This was the tenth tournament championship held by the Trans America Athletic Conference, in its tenth year of existence.  won their first tournament championship and earned the conference's automatic bid to the 1988 NCAA Division I baseball tournament.

Format and seeding 
The top two finishers from each division by conference winning percentage qualified for the tournament, with the top seed from one division playing the second seed from the opposite in the first round.

Bracket

All-Tournament Team 
The following players were named to the All-Tournament Team.

Most Valuable Player 
Mike Sempeles was named Tournament Most Valuable Player. Hendley was an outfielder for Stetson.

References 

Tournament
ASUN Conference Baseball Tournament
1988 in sports in Louisiana